Benjamin Schwarz (born 1986) is a German footballer.

Benjamin Schwarz may also refer to:
Benjamin Schwarz (writer) (born 1963), American magazine editor

See also
Benjamin Schwartz (disambiguation)